This is a list of mayors of Taunton, Massachusetts.  Taunton was led by a Board of Selectmen from 1639 until its re-incorporation as a city in 1864.  The first city government was inaugurated on January 2, 1865.

Gallery

References

Taunton